Admiral Sir Guy Grantham,  (9 January 1900 – 8 September 1992) was a senior Royal Navy officer who served as Commander-in-Chief, Portsmouth from 1957 to 1959.

Naval career
Educated at Rugby School, Grantham joined the Royal Navy in 1918.

Grantham served in the Second World War, initially as commander of the cruiser  and was involved in the evacuation from Greece, for which he was awarded the Distinguished Service Order. After a period as a liaison officer in the Western Desert, he became Commander of the cruiser , which was sunk by a torpedo in March 1942. He then became commander of the cruiser , in which he was involved in the defeat of the Italian Fleet at the second Battle of Birte. His last wartime command was of the aircraft carrier , which was involved in the landings in Sicily. He went on to be Director of Plans at the Admiralty.

After the war, Grantham became Chief of Staff to the Commander-in-Chief, Mediterranean Fleet in 1946. He was appointed Flag Officer Submarines in 1948, Flag Officer, Second in Command of the Mediterranean Fleet in 1950 and Vice Chief of the Naval Staff in 1951. He became Commander-in-Chief, Mediterranean Fleet and NATO Commander Allied Forces Mediterranean in 1954 and then Commander-in-Chief, Portsmouth and Allied Commander-in-Chief, Channel and southern North Sea in 1957. He retired in 1959.

Grantham was also First and Principal Naval Aide-de-camp to the Queen from 1958 to 1959.

In retirement Grantham became Governor and Commander-in-Chief Malta from 1959 to 1962.

Family
In 1934 Grantham married Beryl Mackintosh-Walker; they went on to have two daughters.

References

|-

|-

|-

|-

|-

1900 births
1992 deaths
People educated at Rugby School
Knights Grand Cross of the Order of the Bath
Commanders of the Order of the British Empire
Companions of the Distinguished Service Order
Royal Navy admirals
Royal Navy officers of World War II
Lords of the Admiralty
Governors and Governors-General of Malta
Military personnel from Lincolnshire